The Siamese fighting fish (Betta splendens), commonly known as the betta, is a freshwater fish native to Southeast Asia, namely Cambodia, Laos, Myanmar, Malaysia, Indonesia, Thailand, and Vietnam. It is one of 73 species of the genus Betta, but the only one eponymously called "betta", owing to its global popularity as a pet; Betta splendens are among the most popular aquarium fish in the world, due to their diverse and colorful morphology and relatively low maintenance. 

Siamese fighting fish are endemic to the central plain of Thailand, where they were first domesticated at least 1,000 years ago, among the longest of any fish. They were initially bred for aggression and subject to gambling matches akin to cockfighting. Bettas became known outside Thailand through King Rama III (1788-1851), who is said to have given some to Theodore Cantor, a Danish physician, zoologist, and botanist. They first appeared in the West in the late 19th century, and within decades became popular as ornamental fish. B. splendens long history of selective breeding has produced a wide variety of coloration and finnage, earning it the moniker, "designer fish of the aquatic world".

Bettas are well known for being highly territorial, with males prone to attacking each other if housed in the same tank; without a means of escape, this will usually result in the death of one or both fish. Female bettas can also become territorial towards one another in confined spaces. Bettas are exceptionally tolerant of low oxygen levels and poor water quality, owing to their special labyrinth organ, a characteristic unique to the suborder Anabantoidei that allows for the intake of surface air. 

In addition to its worldwide popularity, the Siamese fighting fish is the national aquatic animal of Thailand, which remains the primary breeder and exporter of bettas for the global aquarium market. Despite their abundance as pets, B. splendens is listed as "vulnerable" by the IUCN, due to increasing pollution and habitat destruction.

Etymology 
Outside Southeast Asia, the name "betta" is used specifically to describe B. splendens, despite the term scientifically applying to the entire genus, which includes B. splendens and at least 72 other species. Betta splendens is more accurately called by its scientific name or "Siamese fighting fish" to avoid confusion with the other members of the genus.

English-speakers often pronounce betta as "bay-tuh", after the second letter in the Greek alphabet. However, it is believed the name is derived from the Malay word ikan betta, with ikan meaning "fish" and bettah referring to an ancient warrior tribe, which is pronounced "bet-tah". Alternative sources suggests the name Betta splendens is formed from two languages, consisting of Malay for "enduring fish" and the Latin word for shining.

Another vernacular name for Siamese fighting fish is plakat, often applied to the short-finned ornamental strains, which is derived from the Thai word pla kat (Thai: ปลากัด), which literally means "biting fish". This name is used in Thailand for all members of the Betta genus, which share similar aggressive tendencies, rather than for any specific strain of the Siamese fighting fish. Thus, the term "fighting fish" is used to generalise all Betta species besides the Siamese fighting fish.

Siamese fighting fish were originally given the scientific name Macropodus pugnax in 1849—literally "aggressive fish with big feet", likely in reference to their elongated pelvic fins. In 1897 they were identified with the genus Betta and became known as Betta pugnax, referring to their aggressiveness. In 1909, the species was finally renamed Betta splendens upon the discovery that an existing species was already named pugnax.

Description
Although aquarium specimens are widely known for their brilliant colours and large, flowing fins, the natural coloration of B. splendens is generally green, brown and grey, while the fins are short; wild fish exhibit strong colours only when agitated. In captivity, Siamese fighting fish have been selectively bred to display a vibrant array of colours and tail types.

Distribution and habitat 

According to Witte and Schmidt (1992), Betta splendens is native to Southeast Asia, including the northern Malay Peninsula, central and eastern Thailand, Kampuchea (Cambodia), and southern Vietnam. Based on Vidthayanon (2013), a Thai ichthyologist and senior researcher of biodiversity at WWF Thailand, the species is endemic to Thailand, from the Mae Khlong to Chao Phraya basins, the eastern slope of the Cardamom mountains (Cambodia), and from the Isthmus of Kra. Similarly, a report from Froese and Pauly (2019) identifies Betta splendens as native to Cambodia, Laos, Thailand, and Vietnam. They are also found throughout the neighbouring Malay Peninsula and in adjacent parts of Sumatra, likely due to human introduction. 

Wherever they are found, Betta splendens generally inhabit shallow bodies of water with abundant vegetation, including marshes, floodplains, and paddy fields. The historic prevalence of rice farming across Southeast Asia, which provided an ideal habitat for bettas, led to their discovery and subsequent domestication by humans. The combination of shallow water and high air temperature causes gases to rapidly evaporate, leading to a significant deficit of oxygen in the betta's natural habitat. This environment likely led to the evolution of the lung-like labyrinth organ, which allows Siamese fighting fish—like all members of the suborder Anabantoidei—to breathe directly from the air. Subsequently, bettas can live and even thrive in harsher environments than other freshwater fish, which in turn leaves them with fewer natural predators and competitors.In the wild, bettas thrive at a fairly low population density of 1.7 individuals per square meter. 

The tropical climate of the betta's natural habitat is characterized by sudden and extreme fluctuations in water availability, chemistry, and temperature. Water pH can range from slightly acidic (pH 6.9) to highly alkaline (pH 8.2), while air temperatures drop as low as 15 °C (59 °F) and rise as high as 40 °C (100 °F). Consequently, Siamese fighting fish are highly adaptable and durable, able to tolerate a variety of harsh or toxic environments; this accounts for their popularity as pets, as well as their ability to successfully colonize bodies of water all over the world.

Wild bettas prefer to live in bodies of water teeming with aquatic vegetation and surface foliage, such as fallen leaves and water lilies. The abundance of plants provides security from predators and a buffer between aggressive males, who coexist by claiming dense sections of plants as territory. Such vegetation also offers protection to females during spawning and to fry during their earliest and most vulnerable stages.

Invasive species
The betta's worldwide popularity has led to its release and establishment in similarly tropical areas, including southeast Australia, Brazil, Colombia, the Dominican Republic, southeast United States, and Singapore. 

In January 2014, a large population of bettas was discovered in the Adelaide River Floodplain in the Northern Territory, Australia. As an invasive species they pose a threat to native fish, frogs and other wetland wildlife. Bettas have also become established in subtropical areas of the United States, namely southern Texas and Florida, although an assessment by the U.S. Fish and Wildlife Service determined they were no threat to natural ecosystems.

Conservation status 
Due to their popularity, Siamese fighting fish are highly abundant in captivity.  In the wild, betta habitats are threatened by chemical and agricultural run off, in addition to the contamination of human medication residue into aquatic ecosystems from the sewage system. Such contamination can also alter the reproductive behavior of the species by decreasing hatch rate and increasing the likelihood of fathers eating their own eggs. Due to the expansion of palm oil plantation in Southeast Asia, wild bettas are also facing habitat loss. The primary threats are habitat destruction and pollution, caused by urban and agricultural development across central Thailand. Wild specimens are categorized by the IUCN as vulnerable, indicating the species is likely to become endangered without conservation efforts.

Diet
Betta splendens is naturally carnivorous, feeding on zooplankton, small crustaceans, and the larvae of aquatic insects such as mosquitoes, as well as insects that have fallen into the water and algae. Contrary to some marketing materials in the pet trade, bettas cannot subsist solely on vegetation or the roots of plants.

Bettas can be fed a varied diet of pellets, flakes, or frozen foods like brine shrimp, bloodworms, daphnia and many others. Due to their short digestive tracts—a characteristic of most carnivores—bettas have difficulty processing carbohydrates such as corn and wheat, which are commonly used as fillers in many commercial fish foods. Thus, regardless of the source, a proper betta diet should consist mostly of animal protein.

Bettas are susceptible to overfeeding, which can lead to obesity, constipation, swim bladder disease, and other health problems; excessive food may also pollute the water. It is generally advised to feed a betta at least once daily, with only the amount of food it can eat within 3–5 minutes; leftover food should be removed.

Some sources recommend that bettas undergo a "fast" for at least one day to allow food to be fully processed. Bettas can go up to two weeks without eating, and it is not uncommon for them to have no appetite for one or two days, especially following stressful episodes such as a water change or being introduced into a new tank.

Reproduction and early development
If interested in a female, male bettas will flare their gills, spread their fins and twist their bodies in a dance-like performance. Receptive females will respond by darkening in color and developing vertical lines known as "breeding bars". Males build bubble nests of various sizes and thicknesses at the surface of the water, which interested females may examine. Most do this regularly even if there is no female present.

Plants or rocks that break the surface often form a base for bubble nests. During courtship, the male betta may exhibit aggressive behavior towards the female by acts of chasing or nipping at her fins. The act of spawning itself is called a "nuptial embrace", for the male wraps his body around the female; around 10–40 eggs are released during each embrace, until the female is exhausted of eggs. With each deposit of eggs, the male releases milt into the water, and fertilisation takes place externally. During and after spawning, the male uses his mouth to retrieve sinking eggs and place them in the bubble nest; during mating some females assist their partner, but more often will simply devour all the eggs she manages to catch. Once the female has released all of her eggs, she is chased away from the male's territory, as she will likely eat the eggs. If she is not removed from the tank, she will most likely be killed by the male.

The eggs remain in the male's care. He carefully keeps them in his bubble nest, making sure none fall to the bottom, repairing the bubble nest as needed. Incubation lasts for 24–36 hours; newly hatched larvae remain in the nest for the next two to three days until their yolk sacs are fully absorbed. Afterwards, the fry leave the nest and the free-swimming stage begins. In this first period of their lives, B. splendens fry are totally dependent on their gills; the labyrinth organ, which allows the species to breathe atmospheric oxygen, typically develops at three to six weeks of age, depending on the general growth rate, which can be highly variable. B. splendens can reach sexual maturity in as early as 4–5 months. Typically, the morphological differences between males and females can be noticed around two months after hatching. During development, betta fry can be fed either commercial artificial feeds, or live moving prey, which tends to be favored more. Examples of live feed for betta fry include baby brine shrimp, water fleas, and mosquito larvae. Although common fed to fish fry, boiled egg yolks are not preferred by the fish.

History
Information on precisely how and when Siamese fighting fish were first domesticated and brought out of Asia is sparse.  Genetic analysis implies domestication at least 1,000 years ago.  Additional evidence from DNA sampling suggests bettas may have been bred for fighting since the 13th century. Over time, this led to the diverse genetics of modern domestic and wild bettas.

Fighting fish
Some people in Malaysia and Thailand are known to have collected wild bettas at least by the 19th century, observing their aggressive nature and pitting them against each other in gambling matches akin to cockfights. In the wild, betta spar for only a few minutes before one fish retreats; domesticated betta, namely Plakat bettas, are bred specifically for heightened aggression, and can engage for much longer, with winners determined by a willingness to continue fighting; once a fish retreats, the match is over. Fights to the death were rare, so bets were placed on the bravery of the fish rather than its survival. Due to the difference in genetics from domesticated bettas being originally bred for fighting, captive ornamental species tends to be more aggressive than wild betta species.

The popularity of these fights garnered the attention of king of Siam (Thailand) who regulated and taxed the matches and collected fighting fish of his own. In 1840, he gave some of his prized fish to Danish physician Theodore Edward Cantor, who worked in the Bengal medical service. Nine years later, Cantor published the first recorded article describing these fish, giving them the name Macropodus pugnax. In 1909, British ichthyologist Charles Tate Regan found there was a related species already named Macropodus pugnax, and thus renamed the domesticated Siamese fighting fish, Betta splendens, or "splendid fighter".

Aquarium fish
Betta splendens first entered the Western aquarium trade in the late 19th century; the earliest known arrival is 1874 in France, when French aquaria expert and ichthyologist Pierre Carbonnier began importing and breeding several specimens. In 1896, German tropical fish expert Paul Matte brought the first specimens into Germany from Moscow, most likely from the strain developed by Carbonnier. This indicates bettas were already somewhat established in France and Russia by the turn of the 20th century. Fighting fish were also present in Australia by 1904, based on an article written by British-born zoologist Edgar Ravenswood Waite and published by the Australian Museum in Sydney. Waite indicates that Australian specimens were brought from Penang, Malaysia, near the border with Thailand. He also makes reference to two articles about "fighting fish" published by Carbonnier in 1874 and 1881. Bettas may have first entered the United States in 1910, via importers in California; there is also evidence they were imported in 1927 from Cambodia.

While it is unclear when bettas became popular in the aquarium trade, the early 20th century marked the first known departure from centuries of breeding bettas for aggression, to instead selecting for colour, finnage, and overall beauty for ornamental purposes. In 1927, an article was published in Germany describing the long, flowing fins of the "veiltail" breed, which indicates an emphasis on aesthetic beauty. In the 1950s, an American breeder created a larger and longer-finned veiltail, while around 1960, Indian breeders discovered a genetic mutation that allowed for two caudal fins, producing the "doubletail" variety. Within that decade, a German breeder created the "deltatail" characterised by its broader, triangular fins.

In 1967, a group of betta breeders formed the International Betta Congress (IBC), the first formal interest group dedicated to Siamese fighting fish. The IBC aimed to breed varieties that would be healthier and more symmetrical in fins and body shape, with an emphasis on animal welfare.

In the aquarium

Water 

When kept in colder climates, aquarium heaters are recommended, as colder water weakens their immune system and makes them susceptible to certain diseases.

Bettas are also affected by the pH of the water: a neutral pH of 7.0 is ideal, but slightly higher levels are tolerable. Due to their labyrinth organ, bettas can endure low oxygen levels, but cannot survive for long in unmaintained aquaria, as poor water quality makes all tropical fish more susceptible to diseases like fin rot. Thus, notwithstanding the betta's well known tolerance of still water, a mechanical filter is considered necessary for their long-term health and longevity. Similarly, live aquatic plants provide a supplemental source of filtration, in addition to crucial enrichment to the betta.

Aquarium size and cohabitants 

Despite frequently being displayed and sold in small containers in the pet trade, bettas do best in larger environments; while they can survive in cups, bowls, and other confined spaces, they will be much happier, healthier, and longer-lived in a larger aquarium. Although some betta enthusiasts claim there is a minimum tank size, determining a strict baseline is somewhat arbitrary and subject to debate. The consensus is that the ideal tank should be no less than 9–19 litres (3–5 US gallons), though a tank of just 4 litres (1 gallon) can also suffice if it is cleaned regularly—at least every other day for small, unfiltered tanks—and maintained at an acceptable temperature of 24–26 °C (75–78 °F).

Although male bettas are solitary and aggressive towards one another, they can generally cohabit with many types of fish and invertebrates if there is adequate space and hiding places. However, compatibility varies based on the temperament of the individual betta, and it is advised to carefully supervise the betta's interaction with other fish. Tankmates must be tropical, communal, nonterritorial, and not have a similar body type or long flowing fins; coldwater fish like goldfish have incompatible temperature requirements, while aggressive and predatory fish are likely to nip at the betta's fins or erode their slime coat. Species that shoal, such as tetras and danios, are considered most ideal, since they usually keep to themselves and can endure the territorial nature of bettas with their numbers. Brightly coloured fish with large fins, such as male guppies, should be avoided, as they may invite fin nipping by the male betta. Potential tankmates should usually be added before the male betta so they can establish their respective territories beforehand, rather than compete with the betta.

Female bettas are less aggressive and territorial than males, and thus can live with a greater variety of fish; for example, brightly coloured or large-finned fish will not usually disturb a female. Generally, female fighting fish can also tolerate larger or more numerous tankmates than males. However, like male bettas, a female's tolerance of other fish will vary by individual temperament.

It is not recommended to keep male and female bettas together, except temporarily for breeding purposes, which should always be undertaken with caution and supervision.

Setup 
Bettas are fairly intelligent and inquisitive, and thus require stimulation; otherwise they can become bored and depressed, leading to lethargy and a weaker immune system. Decorations such as plastic or live plants, rocks, caves, driftwood, and other ornaments provide crucial enrichment—provided they do not have rough textures or jagged edges, which can damage their delicate fins. In the wild, Siamese fighting fish spend most of their time concealing themselves under floating debris or overhanging plants to avoid potential predators. Floating plants and leaves can help bettas feel more secure, while also giving males an anchor from which to build their bubble nests. Abundant vegetation of any kind is generally recommended to provide maximum security and to cater to the betta's instinct to claim protective territory.

Indian almond leaves are increasingly popular for providing something closer to the natural foliage under which bettas would hide in the wild. Their tannins allegedly confer several health benefits, including treating certain ailments like fin rot and bladder disease, and stabilising the pH of the water.

Health and wellness 
When properly kept and fed a correct diet, Siamese fighting fish generally live between three and five years in captivity, though in rare cases may live as long as seven to ten years. One study found that bettas kept in tanks of several gallons and provided with proper nutrition and "exercise"—in the form of being chased around by a stick for a short period—lived over nine years; by contrast, a control group of bettas confined to small jars lived far fewer years. A larger tank with proper filtration, regular maintenance, and an abundance of decor and hiding spaces, along with a rich, protein-based diet, increases the likelihood of a long lifespan.

Like all tropical fish in captivity, bettas are susceptible to several kinds of diseases, usually caused by bacterial, fungal, or parasitic infections. Most illnesses result from poor water quality and cold water, both of which weaken the immune system. The four most common illnesses are white spot, velvet, fin rot, and dropsy; with the exception of the latter, which is incurable, these ailments can be treated with a combination of over-the-counter fish medication, increased water temperature, and/or regular water changes.

When kept in communal tanks, fin nipping from other fish can lead to the onset of fin rot in betta fish, and this can make it more difficult to diagnose.

Varieties
Over a century of intensive selective breeding has produced a wide variety of colours and fin types, and breeders around the world continue to develop new varieties. Often, the males of the species are sold preferentially in stores because of their beauty relative to the females, which almost never develop fins or vibrant colours as showy as their male counterparts; however, some breeders have produced females with fairly long fins and bright colours.

Betta splendens can be hybridised with B. imbellis, B. mahachaiensis, and B. smaragdina, though with the latter, the fry tend to have low survival rates. In addition to these hybrids within the genus Betta, intergeneric hybridisation of Betta splendens and Macropodus opercularis, the paradise fish, has been reported.

Colors

Wild bettas exhibit strong colours only when agitated. Over the centuries, breeders have been able to make this coloration permanent, and a wide variety of hues breed true. Colours among captive bettas include red, orange, yellow, blue, steel blue, turquoise/green, black, pastel, opaque white, and multi-coloured. Recent evidence suggest blue-colored males may show higher levels of aggression than red-colored males. On the other hand, female bettas may have a preference for red-colored mates as opposed to their blue counterparts.

The betta's diverse colours are due to different layers of pigmentation in their skin. The layers, from deepest within to the outermost, consists of red, yellow, black, iridescent (blue and green), and metallic (not a colour itself, but reacts with the other colours). Any combination of these layers can be present, leading to a wide variety of colours within and among bettas.
 
The shades of blue, turquoise, and green are slightly iridescent, and can appear to change colour with different lighting conditions or viewing angles; this is because these colours (unlike black or red) are not due to pigments, but created through refraction within a layer of translucent guanine crystals. Breeders have also developed different colour patterns such as marble and butterfly, as well as metallic shades like copper, gold, or platinum, which were obtained by crossing B. splendens to other Betta species).

Some bettas will change colours throughout their lifetime, a process known as marbling, which is attributed to a transposon, in which a DNA sequence can change its position within a genome, thereby altering a cell. Koi bettas have mutated over time and in some case change colours or patterns throughout their lifetime (known as true Koi), due to the defective gene that causes marbling not being repaired in the color layers after some time.
Common colours:

 Super Red
 Super Blue
 Super Yellow
 Opaque
 Super Black
 Super White
 Orange
 Marble
 Candy
 Nemo
 Galaxy Nemo
 Koi
 Alien
 Copper
 Cellophane
 Gold
 Galaxy Koi

Rarer colours:
 Super Orange
 Metallic
 Turquoise
 Lavender
 Mustard Gas
 Grizzle
 Green
 Purple

Colour patterns:

Finnage variations
Breeders have developed several different finnage and scale variations:
 Veiltail – Extended finnage length and non-symmetrical tail; caudal fin rays usually only split once; the most common tail type seen in pet stores.
 Crowntail – Fin rays are extended well beyond the membrane and consequently the tail can take on the appearance of a crown; also called fringetail
 Combtail – Less extended version of the crown tail, derived from breeding crown and another finnage type
 Halfmoon – "D" shaped caudal fin that forms a 180° angle, the edges of the tail are crisp and straight
 Over-Halfmoon or Super Delta Tail – Caudal fin exceeds 180° angle (a byproduct of trying to breed half-moons), which can sometimes cause problems because the fins are too big for the fish to swim properly
 Rosetail – Variation with so much finnage that it overlaps and looks like a rose
 Feather tail – Similar to the Rosetail, with a rougher appearance
 Plakat – Short fins that resemble the fins seen in wild-type bettas
 Halfmoon plakat – Short-finned Halfmoon; plakat and halfmoon cross
 Double tail or Full-moon – Tail fin is duplicated into two lobes and the dorsal fin is significantly elongated, the two tails can show different levels of bifurcation depending on the individual
 Delta tail – Tail spread less than that of a Halfmoon (less than 180°)
 Super Delta (aka SD or SDT) – Enhanced version of the Delta; one step closer to the Halfmoon variety in that their tails have a span between 130 -170 degrees
 Half-Sun – Combtail with caudal fin going 180°, like a half-moon
 Elephant Ear – Pectoral fins are much larger than normal, often white, resembling the ears of an elephant
 Spade Tail – Caudal fin has a wide base that narrows to a small point

Behaviour and intelligence

Siamese fighting fish display complex behavioural patterns and social interactions, which vary among individual specimens. Research indicates they are capable of associative learning, in which they adopt a consistent response following exposure to new stimuli. These characteristics have made bettas subject to intensive study by ethologists, neurologists, and comparative psychologists.

Males and females flare or puff out their gill covers (opercula) to appear more impressive, either to intimidate other rivals or as an act of courtship. Flaring also occurs when they are intimidated by movement or a change of scene in their environments. In captivity, bettas can be seen flaring at their own reflection because they don't pass the mirror test for self-recognition. Both sexes display pale horizontal bars if stressed or frightened. However, such colour changes, common in females of any age, are rare in mature males due to their intensity of colour. Females often flare at other females, especially when setting up a pecking order. Flirting fish behave similarly, with vertical instead of horizontal stripes indicating a willingness and readiness to breed.

Betta splendens enjoy a decorated tank, as they seek to establish territory even when housed alone. They may set up a territory centered on a plant or rocky alcove, sometimes becoming highly possessive of it and aggressive toward trespassing rivals; consequently, bettas, if housed with other fish, require at least 45 litres (about 10 gallons). Contrary to popular belief, bettas are compatible with many other species of aquarium fish. Given the proper parameters bettas will only be aggressive towards smaller and slower fish than themselves, such as guppies.

Betta aggression has historically made them objects of gambling; two male fish are pitted against each other to fight, with bets placed on which one will win. Combat is characterised by fin nipping, flared gills, extended fins, and intensified colour. The fight continues until one participant is submissive or tries to retreat; one or both fish may die depending on the seriousness of their injuries, though bettas rarely intend to fight to the death. To avoid fights over territory, male Siamese fighting fish are best isolated from one another. Males will occasionally respond aggressively even to their own reflections. Though this is obviously safer than exposing the fish to another male, prolonged sight of their reflection may lead to stress in some individuals. Not all Siamese fighting fish respond negatively to other males, especially if the tank is large enough for each fish to create their own designated territory.

Aggression in females
In general, studies have shown that females exhibit similar aggressive behaviours to males, albeit less frequently and intensely. An observational study examined a group of female Siamese fighting fish over a period of two weeks, during which time they were recorded attacking, flaring, and biting food. This indicated that when females are housed in small groups, they form a stable dominance order, or "pecking order". For example, the fish ranked at the top showed higher levels of mutual displays, in comparison to the fish who were of lower ranks. The researchers also found that the duration of the displays differed depending on whether an attack occurred. The results of this research suggest that female Siamese fighting fish warrant as much scientific study as males, as they seem to have variations in their behaviours as well.

Courtship behaviour
There has been much research in the courtship behaviour between male and female Siamese fighting fish. Studies generally focus on the aggressive behaviours of males during the courtship process. For example, one study found that when male fish are in the bubble nest phase, their aggression toward females is quite low. This is due to the males attempting to attract potential mates to their nest, so eggs can successfully be laid. It has also been found that in determining a suitable mate, females often "eavesdrop" on pairs of males that are fighting. When a female witnesses aggressive behaviour between males, she is more likely to be attracted to the male who won. In contrast, if a female did not "eavesdrop" on a fight between males, she will show no preference in mate choice. In regards to the males, the "loser" is more likely to attempt to court the fish who did not "eavesdrop", while the "winner" showed no preference between females who “eavesdropped” and those who did not.

One study considered the ways in which male Siamese fighting fish alter their behaviours during courtship when another male is present. During this experiment, a dummy female was placed in the tank. The researchers expected that males would conceal their courtship from intruders; instead, when another male fish was present, the male was more likely to engage in courtship behaviours with the dummy female fish. When no barriers were present, the males were more likely to engage in gill flaring at an intruder male fish. The researchers concluded that the male was attempting to court the female and communicate with its rival at the same time. These results indicate the importance of considering courtship behaviour, as the literature has suggested there are many factors that can dramatically affect the ways in which both male and females can act in courtship settings.

Metabolic costs of aggression
Studies have found that Siamese fighting fish often begin with behaviours that require high cost, and gradually decrease their behaviours as the encounter proceeds. This indicates that Siamese fighting fish will first begin an encounter using much metabolic energy, but will gradually decrease, as to not use too much energy, thus making the encounter a waste if the fish is not successful. Similarly, researchers have found that when pairs of male Siamese fighting fish were kept together in the same tank for a three-day period, aggressive behaviour was most prevalent during the mornings of the first two days of their cohabitation. However, the researchers observed that the fighting between the two males decreased as the day progressed. The male in the dominant position initially had metabolic advantage; although as the experiment progressed, both fish became equal in regards to metabolic advantages. In regards to oxygen consumption, one study found that when two male bettas fought, the metabolic rates of both fish did not differ before or during the fight. However, the fish who won showed higher oxygen consumption during the evening following the fight. This indicates that aggressive behaviour in the form of fighting has long-lasting effects on metabolism.

Behavioural effects of chemical exposure
Siamese fighting fish are popular models for studying the neurological and physiological impact of certain chemicals, such as hormones, since their aggression is the result of cell signalling and possibly genes.

One study investigated the effect of testosterone on female Siamese fighting fish. Females were given testosterone, which resulted in changes to fin length, body coloration and gonads that resembled typical male fish. Their aggressive behaviour was found to be elevated when interacting with other females, but reduced when interacting with males. The researchers then allowed the females to interact with a control group of unaltered females; when the female fish stopped receiving testosterone, those who were exposed to the normal females still exhibited male-typical behaviours. In contrast, the female fish who were kept isolated did not continue to exhibit the male typical behaviours after testosterone was discontinued.

Another study exposed male Siamese fighting fish to endocrine-disrupting chemicals. The researchers were curious if exposure to these chemicals would affect the ways in which females respond to the exposed males. It was found that when shown videos of the exposed males, the females favoured those who were not exposed to the endocrine-disrupting chemicals, and avoided those males that were exposed. The researchers concluded that exposure to these chemicals can negatively affect the mating success of male Siamese fighting fish.

A psychology study used male Siamese fighting fish to investigate the effects of fluoxetine, an SSRI used primarily as an antidepressant in humans. Siamese fighting fish were selected as prime models due to having comparable serotonin transporter pathways, which accounts for their aggression. It was found that when exposed to fluoxetine, male Siamese fighting fish exhibited less aggressive behaviour than is characteristic of their species. Similarly, research has found that bettas are responsive to serotonin, dopamine, and GABA.

Sleep Behavior
Betta fish can exhibit unusual sleep behaviors, often resulting in new betta owners assuming that their betta fish has died. In an aquarium, betta fish sleep anywhere in the tank they feel comfortable, including at the bottom on the substrate, floating at the mid-level, or at the surface. Betta fish will sleep on their side, upside down, with their nose pointing up, or with their tail pointing up. They are also known to curl up or wedge between tight spaces, such as behind a heater. One of the more unusual sleep behaviors that betta fish exhibit is their ability to sleep out of the water, resting on a leaf or any other flat object protruding from the water. This is made possible by the betta's labyrinth organ, which acts like a human lung, pulling oxygen from the air instead of from the water. When betta fish sleep, their bright colors will often fade, and when combined with their unusual napping positions, they can appear dead. Predatory fish will often avoid eating a dead fish because of the risk of contracting diseases and parasites, making this an excellent defensive mechanism.

Genetics 
Despite its commercial popularity, little is known about the Betta splendens genome. Current understanding is so limited that there is little evidence for the genetic basis of basic traits, including sex determination. A 2021 review article argued for increased scientific investigation into the genome of the Siamese fighting fish, and listed several areas of interest which are paraphrased below:

 monophyly of the genus Betta including a single-versus-multiple origin of mouthbrooding; 
 the state of cryptic diversity and evolutionary forces driving speciation in the betta lineage; 
 responsive genes or genetic interaction to parental care, behavioural aggression, pigmentation and other betta biology; and 
 preservation technology for betta as insurance against accidental loss of biodiversity this century.

Additionally, betta fish have been used in several studies to assess the impacts of various environmental contaminants, including oil. Improved understanding of the betta genome would allow for more accurate generalisations from these studies. Lastly, the betta fish is an excellent candidate for a model organism, particularly for aggression and pigmentation development, due to their extreme phenotypes in these areas.

Currently, the complete B. splendens chromosomal and mitochondrial genomes have been sequenced. Both genomes have yet to be annotated, though a roadmap for future efforts has been outlined. Notably, the mitochondrial genome for the peaceful betta, P. imbellis, has also been sequenced, potentially allowing for meaningful comparison between species in the future.

Phylogeny and cryptic diversity 
There are many species in the genus Betta, the majority of which are very morphologically similar. Within Thailand alone there are twelve nominal species with new species being discovered every 5–10 years. Past efforts to differentiate Betta species have been based on observable morphology, but given their visible similarity, this approach has masked much of the cryptic diversity in the genus. Recent speciation efforts have included use of DNA barcoding to differentiate species, specifically comparing the CO1 gene of the mitochondrial genome, resulting in new theories about the relatedness between species and allowing for the construction of new phylogenetic trees.

The morphological similarity between species that can be distinguished genetically suggests that species radiation with cryptic diversity occurred in the Betta lineage. Current theories about the species radiation and speciation take into account the geographic considerations of their native habitat of Thailand, and suggest that the speciation is best described by a model of either allopatric or parapatric speciation.

Genetics of betta biology

Aggression 
B. splendens are known for their intense aggression, which has resulted from intense selective pressures imposed upon them from many generations of artificial selection. Fighting strains of B. splendens have been bred for aggression for over six centuries due to the culture surrounding fighting betta fish and betting money on the results. This has genetically differentiated them from their wild-type counterparts - fighting strains of B. splendens have been shown to be significantly more aggressive than wild bettas, and in addition show differential responses in cortisol production in new environments.

The extreme genetically-driven aggression in fighting strains of B. splendens and their differences from the still-observable wild-type makes them an excellent candidate for a model organism through which to study the genetic basis for aggression.

At present, use of the betta fish as a model organism for studying aggression is in its beginning phases. Little is known about the genetic basis of aggression in betas, though differential degrees of aggression have been observed in different domesticated betta populations.

Research to date 
There is evidence that the genetic basis for aggression in betta fish is not exclusively sex-linked - a recent study found that female bettas of the fighting strain show significantly higher levels of aggression than their female wild-type counterparts, despite the fact that historically only male bettas have been used in fights and thus artificially selected for aggression. However these results are of limited usefulness, given the lack of scientific consensus on the nature of sex determination in bettas.

A recent study found that a fighting pair of bettas will synchronise their gene expression profiles, with particular emphasis on 37 co-expression gene modules, some of which were only synchronised after a certain duration of time had been spent fighting.

Work to identify the genetic basis for aggression has also been performed more generally in other model species, such as zebrafish. These studies have identified dozens of candidate genes in their respective model organisms which could serve as starting points for research into aggression in betta fish. However, more progress must be made on the annotation of the betta genome before this is feasible.

Pigmentation 
See biological pigment

Due to the incredible variation in pigmentation of adult bettas and visible pigment in developing embryos, bettas are an attractive model organism for studying the genetic basis for coloration. Additionally, producing a specific color on demand would be of great interest to the commercial betta fish industry, as the price of a fish is largely determined by its coloration. Prices for attractively coloured fish can be high - single fish with the colours of the Thai flag was sold for over $1,500.

The genetic basis for the synthesis and regulation of pigmentation in teleost fish is generally poorly understood, and bettas are no exception. Most work in this area has been done on other model organisms such as zebrafish or African cichlid fish, however as with aggression, work done with other model organisms to identify candidate genes will be tremendously helpful in identifying the genetic basis of pigmentation in bettas.

Work to date 
In 1990, genetic differences (polymorphisms at several loci) were found between four different color varieties of bettas, though the variations were noted to be small. Later experiments confirmed the presence of genetic variation in hatchery stocks in Thailand, with low average numbers of alleles per locus and high heterozygosity rates.

Notable color phenotypes in B. splendens include the marbled phenotype and the color changing phenotype, the latter of which changes color over the course of its lifetime. While theories for the genetic basis of these phenotypes exist, scientific evidence for the genetic basis of these phenomena are slim to nonexistent.

Other genetic work 
Some of the few candidate genes identified in the literature specific to bettas are immune related genes, which were found in the first whole-body transcriptome of B. splendens obtained by high-throughput sequencing.

Breeding facility 
Today, Southeast Asia dominates the industry of breeding and distribution of Siamese fighting fish globally.  Initially, male and female fry are raised together in communal tanks up until males begin to display aggression at about 4-5 months of age. Males are then kept isolated in a half-pint liquor flask, where hundreds of these pints may be arranged tightly packed on the ground in the breeding facility. Daily feeding of usually bloodworms are dispensed into each flask. At the shoulder of each flask, there is typically a cut to allow water to flow out for an easy water change. Meanwhile, females may be kept in communal tanks until shipping day. Roughly 100,000 male bettas are shipped each week from Thailand to countries around the world.

In popular culture
The Fisheries Department of Thailand is promoting pla kat, or Siamese fighting fish, as the national fish. Department chief Adisorn Promthep said that the proposal will be submitted to the National Identity Office under the Prime Minister's Office for approval. He said that once the status is recognised, fighting fish farming would be promoted, which would generate money and create jobs. He added that credible records show that pla kat of the Betta splendens species are native to Thailand and were first collected for fighting during the reign of King Rama III.
The titular character in the novel Rumble Fish and subsequent film adaptation is a Siamese fighting fish. In both, the character Motorcycle Boy is fascinated with the creatures and dubs them "rumble fish". He speculates that if the fish were to be set free in the river, they wouldn't behave so aggressively. A common misconception regarding keeping B. splendens is that they should live in vases or bowls. However, this has been proven to damage their health, life expectancy, and cause negative behavioural changes.
A scene in the James Bond film From Russia with Love shows three Siamese fighting fish in an aquarium as the villain Ernst Stavro Blofeld likens the modus operandi of his criminal organisation, SPECTRE, to one of the fish that observes as the other two fight to the death, then kills the weakened victor.
In 2020, a Siamese fighting fish kept in a home aquarium in Japan named Lala was livestreamed successfully 'completing' a copy of Pokémon Sapphire by use of a laser that followed the fish and triggered button inputs mapped on a grid behind the tank. Lala's playthrough of the game was carried out over four months, commencing in June 2020 and concluding in November, and the experiment also resulted in the discovery of a glitch that softlocked the game that had previously gone undiscovered.
For the Miss Grand International 2020 contest held in Bangkok in 2021, Laos used a costume inspired by the fish, which some Thai citizens were unhappy with, claiming that the fish costume was a copy of another costume designed be worn by Miss Universe Thailand – Amanda Obdam – in Miss Universe 2020.

See also 
 National symbols of Thailand

References

Further reading

External links

Betta
Fishkeeping
Taxa named by Charles Tate Regan
Fish described in 1910
National symbols of Thailand
Fish of the Mekong Basin
Fish of Malaysia
Fish of Cambodia
Fish of Laos
Fish of Thailand
Fish of Vietnam